Sportsklubben Trane is a Norwegian football club from Årstad, Bergen.

The club was founded on 15 December 1918. The club colors are green and white. The men's football team currently resides in the Fifth Division (sixth tier). It last played in the Third Division from 2000 to 2003.

Famous Players: 

Bård Finne

Eirik Birkelund

Agami Hando

Knut Walde

References

Official site

Football clubs in Norway
Association football clubs established in 1918
Sport in Bergen